The Calaveras Fault is a major branch of the San Andreas Fault System that is located in northern California in the San Francisco Bay Area. Activity on the different segments of the fault includes moderate and large earthquakes as well as aseismic creep. The last large event was the magnitude 6.2 1984 Morgan Hill event. 
The most recent moderate earthquakes were the magnitude 5.1 event on 25 October 2022, and the magnitude 5.6 2007 Alum Rock event.

It is believed to link with the Hayward fault, as well as the West Napa Fault, north of the Carquinez Strait. It passes through or near the cities of Alamo, Danville, San Ramon, Dublin, Pleasanton, Sunol, Milpitas, San Jose, Gilroy, and Hollister.

Location

To the east of the Hayward-Rodgers Creek fault, the Calaveras fault extends , splaying from the San Andreas fault near Hollister and terminating at Danville at its northern end. It runs east of the San Andreas, diverging from it in the vicinity of Hollister, California, and is responsible for the formation of the Calaveras Valley there. Between the San Andreas Fault and the Calaveras Fault lies the Hayward Fault, which diverges from the Calaveras Fault east of San Jose, California. To the east lies the Clayton-Marsh Creek-Greenville Fault. These four fault structures are some of the major faults in California at the latitude of San Francisco. All are right lateral-moving strike-slip faults.

The Calaveras Fault was named for Calaveras Creek in Santa Clara County east of San Jose where it was first identified. (Calaveras is Spanish for "skulls".) Some of the cities which the Calaveras Fault passes through or near are: Alamo, Danville, San Ramon, Dublin, Pleasanton, Sunol, Milpitas, San Jose, Gilroy, and Hollister.

Related faults
The West Napa Fault in Napa County is believed to be a continuation of the Calaveras Fault north of the Carquinez Strait.  Between the faults lies an area of minor faults aligned en echelon known as the Contra Costa Shear Zone.

The minor Concord Fault lies to the east of the Calaveras Fault, and small earthquakes occur in the gap between faults, mostly in the vicinity of Alamo, California, relieving stresses generated by the displacement between the two faults. Stresses are also produced by offset and converging slip-strike motions between the Calaveras and Clayton-Marsh Creek-Greenville Fault that continue to elevate Mount Diablo. The compressive pressure is manifest in a significant thrust fault nearby on the western slope of the mountain, the Mount Diablo Thrust Fault, the most active of its kind in the region and which is also capable of producing significant local earthquakes affecting the Alamo-Danville area.

Tectonic forces
The Pacific Plate is a major section of the Earth's crust, gradually expanding by the eruption of magma along the East Pacific Rise to the southeast. It is also being subducted far to the northwest into the Aleutian Trench under the North American Plate well north of San Francisco. In California, the plate is sliding northwestward along a transform boundary, the San Andreas Fault, toward the subduction zone. At the same time, the North American Plate is moving southwestward, but relatively southeast along the fault. The westward component of the North American Plate's motion results in some compressive force along the San Andreas and its associated faults such as the Calaveras Fault, thus helping lift the Coast Ranges. The Calaveras Fault shares the same relative motions of the San Andreas.

Seismic activity

Here are the notable recorded earthquakes on the Calaveras fault: 2022 (5.1), 2007 (5.6), 1984 (6.2) and 1911 (6.5).

A number of magnitude 6 earthquakes have been recorded on the fault throughout recorded history, the largest of which was a magnitude 6.5 that occurred in 1911 in the Morgan Hill area. The most recent of these was a magnitude 6.2 earthquake near Morgan Hill in 1984.

A magnitude 5.6 earthquake occurred on the Calaveras Fault on October 30, 2007 at 20:04 PDT (October 31, at 03:04 UTC), near Alum Rock. Prior to the 2014 South Napa earthquake, it was the most powerful quake to hit the Bay Area since the Loma Prieta earthquake of 1989, and the largest on the Calaveras Fault since 1984. On October 25, 2022 at 11:42 PDT  (October 25, at 18:42 UTC), a magnitude 5.1 earthquake occurred on the fault near Lick Observatory.

Hayward Fault connection
Although it has been known for some time that the Calaveras and Hayward faults merge in the South Bay region, recent geological studies suggest that the Calaveras and Hayward faults may be even more closely connected horizontally deep beneath the surface, angling toward each other with depth until they become a single fault.  If true, this would have significant implications for the potential maximum strength of earthquakes on the Hayward, since this strength is determined by the maximum length of the fault rupture and this rupture could extend beyond the juncture point to include some portion of the Calaveras.

Recent assessment
Assessments in January 2008 suggest that the northern Calaveras fault (the portion between Sunol and Danville) may be more likely to fail in the next few decades than previously thought.

See also
Bernal Subbasin
Tesla Fault

References

Further reading

External links
M6.9 Earthquake on the Calaveras Fault — Southern California Earthquake Center
ABAG shaking hazard maps
Tracking the Elusive Calavaras Fault from Sunol to San Ramon

Seismic faults of California
Strike-slip faults
Geology of Contra Costa County, California
Geology of San Benito County, California
Geology of Santa Clara County, California
Diablo Range

Danville, California
San Ramon, California
Dublin, California
Geography of Pleasanton, California
Milpitas, California
Geography of San Jose, California
Gilroy, California
Hollister, California
Geography of the San Francisco Bay Area